The Medal for Bravery was a military decoration of Austria-Hungary established in 1789 and awarded for bravery in battle until the dissolution of the Austro-Hungarian Empire in 1918.

History

Habsburg Empire 1789-1918
The Medal for Bravery was created by Emperor Joseph II on 19 July 1789 in order to recognize courage in combat by personnel below commissioned rank (courageous acts performed by commissioned officers could after 1757 be rewarded by appointment to the Military Order of Maria Theresa). From 1789 to 1915, the Medal for Bravery existed in three classes: Golden Medal for Bravery, Silver Medal for Bravery 1st Class and Silver Medal for Bravery 2nd Class. The latter honour was similar in design to the Golden Medal and the Silver Medal 1st Class, but considerably smaller.

A fourth class, the Bronze Medal for Bravery, was introduced on 14 February 1915 during World War I. It was the same size as the Silver Medal 2nd Class.

Bars denoting subsequent awards within the same class were introduced on 29 November 1915.

All versions of the Medal for Bravery bore the portrait of the reigning monarch on the obverse and the inscription "Der Tapferkeit" ("To Bravery") on the reverse. Medals awarded during World War I were minted with the portrait of Emperor Franz Josef on the obverse until some months after his death. Starting in April 1917, the visage of his successor, Emperor Charles I, was substituted.

On 26 September 1917, Emperor Charles I amended the statutes of the Medal for Bravery and decreed that the Golden Medal for Bravery and the Silver Medal for Bravery 1st Class could now also be awarded to commissioned officers, particularly in cases where their services were not sufficient for the Military Order of Maria Theresa. Commissioned officers wore the same medals as the ranks, plus the letter "K" (in gold or silver, depending on class of the award) superimposed on the triangular ribbon.

Kingdom of Hungary 1920–46
After World War I and the dissolution of Austria-Hungary, the newly established Kingdom of Hungary instituted in 1922 the Medal of Bravery in silver only.

By 14 April 1939, gold, large silver, small silver and bronze awards were issued to non-commissioned officers and men and, on 12 September 1942, the gold medal for bravery award (Magyar: Tiszti Arany Vitézségi Érem) for officers was added. A notable recipient was Hans-Ulrich Rudel of the German Luftwaffe.

Endnotes

External links

Bravery Medal
Awards established in 1789
1789 establishments in the Holy Roman Empire
Courage awards